The Psychotic Turnbuckles are an Australian garage punk band that originated in Sydney, which was formed in 1984. The group's original members were "Jesse the Intruder"(vocals), "The Grand Wizard"  (guitar), "El Sicodelico" (guitar), 'The Creep', (bass and vocals), and  'The Spoiler', (drums), who died in 2013.

History 
The Psychotic Turnbuckles were part of a wave of hard rock bands that sprang up in Australia in the first half of the 1980s with roots in the US 1960s punk and 1970s big-energy Detroit rock scenes.

Comprising former professional wrestlers who re-located to Australia around 1982 from their hometown of Pismo Beach in California, after being banned from the Pismo Beach Wrestling Alliance by promoter Sammy Duke.

They drew on influences like the 13th Floor Elevators, Radio Birdman, the Moving Sidewalks, the Masters Apprentices, The Sonics and The Aztecs.

Psychotic Turnbuckles quickly became a regular attraction on the healthy Sydney live music circuit and shared stages with the likes of The Troggs, the Hitmen, Dark Carnival, Beasts of Bourbon and the Screaming Tribesmen. They were adopted by the Petersham Inn in Sydney's inner-western suburbs as the regular house band and had a bar (The Pismo Bar) named in their honour. Two members of touring US band Guns and Roses, Duff McKagan and Slash, attended a 1992 show by the band at the Lansdowne Hotel, Sydney.

The band existed for a decade during which time they signed to US label Sympathy For The Record Industry as well as several Australian imprints. The band eventually dissolved as members moved back to the US in the early 1990s.

Inspired by a fan's Facebook page, the line-up of Jesse the Intruder, El Siccoldelico, The Grand Wizard, The Psychedelic Unknown and Gorgeous Karl Domah (aka Lord Domah) re-convened in Sydney in December 2012 for a one-off show.

Encouraged by the reaction, they signed to Australian label Citadel Records who offered to issue a retrospective double CD set (Destroy Dull City) summarizing their career. The band has since played shows in Melbourne, Sydney and Brisbane. The band still play sporadically up until present time

Current and past members 
 Jesse the Intruder — lead vocals (1984-present)
 The Grand Wizard — guitars (1984-present)
 El Sicodelico — guitars (1984-87, 2012-2015)
 The Creep — bass, backing vocals (1984-87)
 The Spoiler - drums (1984-89)
 The Psychedelic Unknown — bass, guitars (1987-93, 1997-2022)
 Bud "The Sledgehammer" Slater — guitars (1987-88)
 Kid Sunshine — guitars (1988-89)
 Mr Ultimate — drums (1989)
 Gorgeous Lord Karl Domah — drums (1989-present)
 Chuck the Rock — bass (1994-97)
 Buddy "Bam Bam" Balam The Brooklyn Bruiser — drums (2016)
 Solomon Grande — guitars (2016)
 Count Forza — guitars (2020-present)
 The Infliktor - bass (2022-present)

Discography 
"Creeps" / "Energy" 7" Single Vi-nil (1984)
"Psychotic Situation" / "The Crusher" 7" Single Vi-nil (1985)
Destroy Dull City 12" 6 Track EP Rattlesnake (1986)
Psychotic Turnbuckles 12" 5 Track EP Rattlesnake (1987)
Go Go Gorilla 12" 3 Track  EP RattleSnake (1987)
Beyond the Flipout  LP Rattlesnake (1987)
"Good Times Outweigh the Bad Times" / "Sudan Butcher" 7" Single Rattlesnake (1988)
Lunar Chik 12" 4 Track EP Rattlesnake (1989)
Pharaohs of the Far Out LP Survival (1989)
"Rock and Roll Terrorists" / "Hero Mountain" 7" Single Shock (1991)
"The American Ruse" 7" 3 Track Single self released (1991)
Louder than Distortion 7"4 Track EP self released (1991)
She's Afraid to Love Me CD 6 Track Shagpile (1992)
"Crazy Times Ahead" 7" 3 track Single sympathy for the record industry (1993)
Figure Four Brain Trance LP Shagpile (1993)
Ride the Wild Sounds CD/ LP Shock (1994)
You Hurt my Head CD self giveaway at concerts (2013)
Destroy Dull City CD LP/ (2013)- CITADEL Records

Notable appearances
In 1986, The Psychotic Turnbuckles appeared on Star Search, performing their song "The Creeps".
In 1987, The Psychotic Turnbuckles appeared in an episode of the TV series Willing and Abel performing non released track "Your Face is Driving Me Insane".
In 2012, the band was interviewed on the Melbourne radio station PBS.
In 2013, the band was interviewed on the Sydney radio station 2RRR.

References

External links
 
 Citadel Records

Musical groups established in 1984
Australian punk rock groups
Garage punk groups